Berry van Peer (born 23 August 1996) is a Dutch darts player who currently plays in World Darts Federation (WDF) events. Previously he competed in Professional Darts Corporation events and being a finalist of the PDC World Youth Championship.

Career
Van Peer won two events on the PDC Development Tour in Coventry in April 2015. He went on to finish third in the 2015 Development Tour Order of Merit and was subsequently awarded a two-year PDC Pro Tour card for 2016 and 2017.

Van Peer qualified for the UK Open and Players Championship Finals in 2016, losing in the second round of each event. He also reached the final of the 19th Development Tour tournament of the year and was defeated 4−3 by Mike de Decker. Van Peer qualified for the final of the PDC World Youth Championship. He played Corey Cadby in the final in Minehead, England in November, but lost 6−2.

Whilst playing at the 2017 Grand Slam of Darts, Van Peer suffered a severe case of dartitis during his match with 2 time World Champion Gary Anderson. Former player and now Sky Sports pundit Wayne Mardle has talked about his struggles with dartitis and has thrown his support behind the young tyro, even touting him as a future champion despite his struggles with the condition. Despite his visible struggles on stage, Van Peer defeated both Simon Whitlock and Cameron Menzies in the group stage, before losing out to Mensur Suljović in the second round.

References

External links

1996 births
Living people
Dutch darts players
Sportspeople from Rucphen
Darts players with dartitis
Professional Darts Corporation former tour card holders